Church of the Blessed Sacrament or variations may refer to:

 Cathedral of the Most Blessed Sacrament, Detroit, Michigan
Blessed Sacrament Catholic Church, Hollywood, Hollywood, Los Angeles, California
 Blessed Sacrament Church (Bronx, New York)
 Church of the Blessed Sacrament (Manhattan), New York
 Church of the Blessed Sacrament (Staten Island, New York)